Vladimír Válek (born 2 September 1935, in Nový Jičín) is a Czech conductor.

He was conductor of the Prague Symphony for 10 years, in which he made his first tours of Europe and the United States. 

He was the Principal Conductor of the Slovak Philharmonic from 2004 until 2007, when he was succeeded by Peter Feranec.

External links
Biography and discography from musicologica.cz (in Czech)

1935 births
Living people
People from Nový Jičín
Czech conductors (music)
Male conductors (music)
Recipients of Medal of Merit (Czech Republic)
21st-century conductors (music)
21st-century Czech male musicians